Jasmin Savoy Brown (born March 21, 1994) is an American actress. She has appeared in the HBO mystery drama series The Leftovers (2015–2017), the ABC legal drama series For the People (2018–2019), and the Showtime psychological drama series Yellowjackets (2021–present). She played leading roles in the slasher films Sound of Violence (2021), Scream (2022) and Scream VI (2023), and provided the voice and motion capture for Phin Mason / Tinkerer in the video game Spider-Man: Miles Morales (2020).

Early life
Brown was born in Alameda, California and raised in Springfield, Oregon. At age four, Brown had her first role in a church musical which sparked her love of performing. Growing up, she participated in numerous musicals and was a member of various musical clubs, choirs and groups, some of which include University of Oregon, Portland Shakespeare Project, Art's Umbrella, Oregon Children's Choir, and Upstart Crow Studios. Following high school, Brown moved to Portland, Oregon to pursue acting.

Career
Brown began with minor roles in NBC's Grimm and Freeform's The Fosters. She went on to star in Camp Harlow and Forgotten Hero, and guest star on NBC's Brooklyn Nine-Nine.

In 2015, Brown landed the recurring role of Evangeline "Evie" Murphy in seasons 2 and 3 of HBO's The Leftovers. Evie is the daughter of Erika and John who goes missing with her friends after an earthquake. Following The Leftovers, Brown was cast as Nina (Cameron's new girlfriend) on Freeform's Stitchers. She went on to play series regular character Emilia Bassano on the TNT drama series Will, which told the story of William Shakespeare. Emilia was a musician, poet, and writer, who went on to become the first female professional English poet and was believed to be the "Dark Lady" of Will’s sonnets.

Brown is a series regular in the Shondaland drama For the People on ABC. Two weeks before the premiere of For the People, she signed with ICM Partners. She was cast in the independent film Sound of Violence as Alexis Reeves, a formerly deaf girl who goes on a murder spree. Initially titled Conductor, the film was released in 2021 to positive reviews for Brown's acting. Jessica Kiang of Variety wrote that Brown gave "a lead performance that oozes empathy as much as her hapless victims ooze blood".

In September 2020, Brown was cast as Mindy Meeks-Martin in the fifth Scream film, which was directed by Matt Bettinelli-Olpin and Tyler Gillett. The film was released on January 14, 2022.  It was a critical and commercial success, and was the 28th-highest grossing film of 2022. She reprises the role in Scream VI, which was released on March 10, 2023.

She also has released at least two songs; "Orange Wine" and "goddamnit" on YouTube.

Personal life
Brown identifies as queer and a lesbian, and is a biracial woman.

Filmography

Film

Television

Video games

Music videos

References

External links
 
  website

1994 births
21st-century American actresses
Actresses from California
Actresses from Portland, Oregon
African-American actresses
American film actresses
American television actresses
LGBT African Americans
LGBT people from California
LGBT people from Oregon
Living people
People from Alameda, California
People from Springfield, Oregon
American lesbian actresses
American queer actresses
Queer women
21st-century African-American women
21st-century African-American people
African-American history of Oregon